Alexander Špoljarić (Greek: Αλεξάντερ Σπόλιαριτς; born 28 November 1995) is a Cypriot football goalkeeper, who plays for Nea Salamis Famagusta FC.

Club career
Born in Limassol, he started playing football in Campus Sportivo Football Academy when he was 4 years old. After completing seven years at the academy, he trained with his father's academy for 1 year as a goalkeeper. Later he was with Aris Limassol academy until he was 17. Finally, he moved to Enosis Neon Parekklisia, which also became his first team after his youth career ended. In summer 2014, he joined OFK Beograd, where he made his professional debut in the last fixture of the 2014–15 Serbian SuperLiga season, against Jagodina. At the beginning of 2017, Špoljarić moved to Belgrade Zone League side Hajduk Beograd on six-month loan. In summer 2017, he moved to Grafičar Beograd as a single player.

Ahead of the 2019-20 season, Špoljarić joined Alki Oroklini. He then moved to Othellos Athienou for the 2020-21 season. In the summer 2021, he moved to Nea Salamis Famagusta FC.

Career statistics

Club

Personal life
Alexander's father is Milenko Špoljarić, who was also a footballer; he is the older brother of Matija and Danilo Špoljarić.

References

1995 births
Living people
Sportspeople from Limassol
Association football goalkeepers
Cypriot footballers
Cypriot expatriate footballers
Cypriot people of Serbian descent
Cypriot people of Croatian descent
OFK Beograd players
FK Hajduk Beograd players
RFK Grafičar Beograd players
Serbian SuperLiga players
Enosis Neon Parekklisia FC players
Aris Limassol FC players
Alki Oroklini players
Othellos Athienou F.C. players
Nea Salamis Famagusta FC players
Cypriot Second Division players